Oranmore-Maree GAA  is a Gaelic Athletic Association club located in the town of Oranmore and surrounding area of Maree, County Galway, Ireland. It was founded in 1967.

History
The club was founded in 1967 and fields teams in both Gaelic football and hurling. The club was formed through a county by-law which ruled that there should be only one team per parish, previous to this Oranmore and Maree had teams. Maree wore green and black jerseys while Oranmore wore Black and Amber. Maree won the Galway Senior Hurling Championship in 1933 beating Castlegar 5-06 to 6-02.

The GAA club has provided several hurlers and footballers to the Galway Senior Hurling Team and football teams these include Pat Malone, who won 2 All-Ireland medals in 1987 and 1988 respectively, Richard Burke, William Burke, Aidan Divney, Michael Hanniffy and later members of the panel Gearoid McInerney, Niall Burke and Brendan Hanniffy.

The GAA Club has also won several under-age titles in both Hurling and Football and completed a unique double in 2014 when the Under 16 and Under 21 footballers and hurlers won their respective championships, this was followed by Minor hurling and football championship victories in 2015. In total the club has won 48 A county hurling championships and 32 A county Football championships. The schools around the parish of Oranmore and Maree have fielded some successful GAA teams over the years with Maree national school winning the A county schools championship on 4 occasions. 

In 2019, Oranmore-Maree pulled off a comeback against Charleville to win the All-Ireland Intermediate Club Hurling Championship for the first time in the club's history.

Achievements
 Galway Minor Hurling Championship (3) 1963 (as Oranmore), 1970, 1989
 Galway Intermediate Hurling Championship (3) 1953 ,1990, 2018
 Galway Senior Hurling Championship (1) 1933
 All-Ireland Intermediate Club Hurling Championship: 2019 (1)

Notable players
 Niall Burke
 Pat Malone
 Gearóid McInerney
 Ciaran Whelan
Gearoid McInerney
Niall Burke
Alan Burke

References

External links
Oranmore-Maree GAA site

Gaelic games clubs in County Galway
Hurling clubs in County Galway
Gaelic football clubs in County Galway